Jan Krol may refer to:

Jan Król (1950), Polish economist and politician
Jan Krol (1962–2023), Dutch actor
Jan Krol (1962–2023), Dutch politician